List of NCAA coaches may refer to: 
 List of current NCAA Division I baseball coaches
 List of current NCAA Division I men's basketball coaches
 List of current NCAA Division I women's basketball coaches
 List of current NCAA Division I FBS football coaches
 List of current NCAA Division I men's ice hockey coaches